The Ministry of Education (Portuguese: Ministério da Educação), also known as MEC, an initialism derived from its former name Ministry of Education and Culture (Portuguese: Ministério da Educação e Cultura), is a cabinet-level federal ministry of Brazil.

It is tasked with coordinating national education policy and daily affairs, from early childhood to the post-graduate level.

History of the institution 
Before 1930, matters relating to education were under responsibility of the National Department of Education, which was a part of the then-called Ministry of Justice.

In 1930, as Getúlio Vargas took office as president, the Ministry of Education and Public Health was created, taking away education matters from the Ministry of Justice.

In 1953, the ministry was split into two: the Ministry of Health, and the Ministry of Education and Culture (with the acronym MEC, which lasts to this day).

In 1985, during José Sarney's presidency, it was again split into two: the Ministry of Culture, and the Ministry of Education.

In 1992, as Itamar Franco took office as president, sports were made part of the ministry again, which was subsequently renamed Ministry of Education and Sports.

In 1995, during Fernando Henrique Cardoso's presidency, that was once again changed, separating the Ministry of Education from the then Ministry of Sports.

Milton Ribeiro, the last Education Minister, resigned on 28 March 2022 after a corruption scandal involving the use of the ministry's budget to help evangelical pastors, fulfilling a request made by president Jair Bolsonaro. On 18 April 2022, President Bolsonaro promoted the Executive-Secretary Victor Godoy for the position of minister.

See also
 Instituto Benjamin Constant
 Universities and higher education in Brazil
 Undergraduate education in Brazil
 Graduate degrees in Brazil
 Bachelor's degree in Brazil
 CNPq (National Council for Scientific and Technological Development)
 Lattes Platform
 Brazilian science and technology
 Coordenadoria de Aperfeiçoamento de Pessoal de Nível Superior (CAPES)
 INEP (National Institute for Research on Education)

References

Bibliography

External links
Official website

Brazil
Education